Kenneth "Ken Jay" Lacey (born June 10, 1966) is an American musician, best known as the original drummer and the co-founder of heavy metal band Static-X.

Biography
Jay was born in Vermilion County, Illinois.  Jay began playing drums early on and had played drums in a couple of metal bands early in his career in central Illinois before heading north to Chicago.  Jay was the drummer in Deep Blue Dream, a band that also included Wayne Static and had auditioned at one point for Smashing Pumpkins but was told by Billy Corgan he was "too metal" to be in the band.  He co-founded Static-X with Wayne Static in 1994. Jay played drums on the band's first two albums, Wisconsin Death Trip and Machine, but before Static-X could begin recording their third album, Shadow Zone, he left the band because of musical and political differences. However, Jay still contributed additional keyboards to the album.

Shortly after his departure, he joined Godhead as a replacement drummer for a brief time. He had kept out of the media limelight for several years.

In 2010, Jay stepped back into music to produce the debut album for Texas-based band, Blood Red Summer. He connected with the band through their guitar player, Erik Fincher, who had worked with Jay at a Virgin Records store in Los Angeles, California, and later became Static-X's long time guitar tech.

After a viral infection, he lost most of the hearing in his right ear.

On October 23, 2018, it was announced that Jay – along with the other two surviving original members, bassist Tony Campos and guitarist Koichi Fukuda – would reunite with Static-X, who plan to release a new album and tour in 2019 in honor of the memory of Wayne Static.

In June 2019, Ken Jay and Ross Hamil (singer of Blood Red Summer) reconnected in Dallas, TX at one of the Wisconsin Death Trip 20th Anniversary Memorial Tour. In early 2020, Hamil approached Jay about contributing programming/sampling to a song called The Monster Within for Hamil's new band LABOR XII on their debut album MONSTERS. The Monster Within is a tribute to Wayne Static and features keyboards and programming from Ken Jay.

References 

1966 births
American heavy metal drummers
American heavy metal keyboardists
Industrial metal musicians
Living people
Nu metal drummers
Static-X members
Godhead (band) members
20th-century American drummers
American male drummers
21st-century American drummers
20th-century American male musicians
21st-century American male musicians